Sunchon Airport(순천비행장) is an airport in Pyongan-namdo, North Korea.

Facilities 
The airfield has a single concrete runway 15/33 measuring 8150 x 157 feet (2484 x 48 m).  It has a full-length parallel taxiway with two aprons at the ends.  One taxiway leads to possible underground storage.  It is home to the 55th fighter regiment of Mikoyan-Gurevich MiG-29 and Sukhoi Su-25 jets.

References 

Airports in North Korea
South Pyongan